Emanuele Severino (26 February 1929 – 17 January 2020) was an Italian philosopher.

Biography
Severino studied at the University of Brescia and graduated at the University of Pavia under Gustavo Bontadini with the first Italian dissertation on Martin Heidegger and the Metaphysics.
Subsequently, Severino broke publicly from Bontadini in 1970 while both were members of faculty of the Università Cattolica del Sacro Cuore in Milan. A student of his as a young man at the Università Cattolica del Sacro Cuore was Cardinal Angelo Scola, who later served as Archbishop of Milan.

Severino spent a number of years on the faculty of the University of Venice as well.

Because of his original philosophical position, the so-called neoparmenidism, Severino was claimed to be "a giant" and "the only philosopher who in the 20th century can be compared to Heidegger" (Massimo Cacciari).

In 1970, the Congregation for the Doctrine of the Faith ruled that Severino's ideas were not compatible with Christianity as the basis of Severino's belief in "the eternity of all being," a belief said to eliminate a Creator God.

Severino received from the President of the Italian Republic the "Golden medal of the Republic for culture merits" (Medaglia d’oro della Repubblica per i Benemeriti della Cultura). In April 2019, Severino was interviewed by the then Italian premier Giuseppe Conte who defined him a focal point of the theoretical philosophy at an international level.

Severino died in January 2020 due to a lung disease.

The eternity of all beings
Severino confronts an ancient problem, rooted in Plato and Aristotle and taken up in the modern era by Heidegger, that of Being. For Severino, all the philosophies which have been formed up to now are characterised by one fundamental error, faith in the Greek sense of becoming. Indeed, since the ancient Greeks, a being (or anything which is) has been considered as coming from nothing, granted existence temporarily, and then returning into nothing.
Severino, reflecting on the absolute opposition between Being and non-Being, given that between the two terms there is nothing in common, considers it evident that being can only remain constantly unchanging, not being changed by anything which is not itself. Thus, since Being is the totality of what exists, there can be nothing else besides it endowed with existence (Severino thereby refutes the concept of ontological difference as put forward by Heidegger). For Severino, therefore, the entire history of philosophy is based on the erroneous conviction that Being can become nothing.

Notable alumni
Among his notable alumini there were the following Italian philosophers: Umberto Galimberti, Luigi Ruggiu (b. 1939), Carmelo Vigna (b. 1940), Mario Ruggenini (1940-2021), Salvatore Natoli (b. 1942), Italo Valent (1944-2003), Luigi Vero Tarca (b. 1947), Luigi Lentini, Giorgio Brianese (1958-2021), Massimo Donà (b. 1952).

Bibliography
Not many of Severino's works have been translated.  One of his crucial works has been translated into German: Vom Wesen des Nihilismus, and into English as The Essence of Nihilism.

 La struttura originaria, Brescia, La Scuola, 1958. Nuova edizione, con modifiche e una Introduzione 1979, Milano, Adelphi, 1981
 Per un rinnovamento nella interpretazione della filosofia fichtiana, Brescia, La Scuola,1960
 Studi di filosofia della prassi, Milano, Vita e pensiero, 1963; nuova ediz.ampliata, Milano, Adelphi, 1984
 Ritornare a Parmenide, in «Rivista di filosofia neoscolastica», LVI [1964], n. 2, pp. 137–175; poi in Essenza del nichilismo, Brescia, Paideia, 1972, pp. 13–66; nuova edizione ampliata, Milano, Adelphi, 1982, pp. 19–61
 Essenza del nichilismo. Saggi, Brescia, Paideia, 1972; seconda edizione ampliata, Milano, Adelphi, 1982
 Vom Wesen des Nihilismus, Stuttgart, Klett-Cotta, 1983, Translation by Magda Oschwald-Di Felice
 Gli abitatori del tempo. Cristianesimo, marxismo, tecnica, Roma, Armando, 1978; nuova edizione ampliata, ivi, 1981
 Téchne. Le radici della violenza, Milano, Rusconi, 1979; seconda edizione, ivi, 1988; nuova edizione ampliata, Milano, Rizzoli, 2002
 Legge e caso, Milano, Adelphi, 1979
 Destino della necessità. Katà tò chreòn, Milano, Adelphi, 1980; nuova edizione, senza modifiche sostanziali, ivi, 1999
 A Cesare e a Dio, Milano, Rizzoli, 1983; nuova ediz., ivi, 2007
 La strada, Milano, Rizzoli, 1983; nuova ediz., ivi, 2008
 La filosofia antica, Milano, Rizzoli, 1984; nuova ediz. ampliata, ivi, 2004
 La filosofia moderna, Milano, Rizzoli, 1984; nuova ediz. ampliata, ivi, 2004
 Il parricidio mancato, Milano, Adelphi, 1985
 La filosofia contemporanea, Milano, Rizzoli, 1986; nuova ediz. ampliata, ivi, 2004
 Traduzione e interpretazione dell’Orestea di Eschilo, Milano, Rizzoli, 1985
 La tendenza fondamentale del nostro tempo, Milano, Adelphi, 1988; nuova ediz., ivi, 2008
 Il giogo. Alle origini della ragione: Eschilo, Milano, Adelphi, 1989.
 La filosofia futura, Milano, Rizzoli, 1989; nuova ediz. ampliata, ivi, 2005
 Il nulla e la poesia. Alla fine dell’età della tecnica: Leopardi, Milano, Rizzoli, 1990; nuova ediz., ivi, 2005
 Filosofia. Lo sviluppo storico e le fonti, Firenze, Sansoni, 3 voll.
 Oltre il linguaggio, Milano, Adelphi, 1992
 La guerra, Milano, Rizzoli, 1992
 La bilancia. Pensieri sul nostro tempo, Milano, Rizzoli, 1992
 Il declino del capitalismo, Milano, Rizzoli, 1993; nuova ediz., ivi, 2007
 Sortite. Piccoli scritti sui rimedi (e la gioia), Milano, Rizzoli, 1994
 Pensieri sul Cristianesimo, Milano, Rizzoli, 1995; nuov ediz., ivi, 2010.
 Tautótēs, Milano, Adelphi, 1995
 La filosofia dai Greci al nostro tempo, Milano, Rizzoli, 1996
 La follia dell'angelo, Milano, Rizzoli, 1997; nuova ediz., Milano, Mimesis, 2006
 Cosa arcana e stupenda. L’Occidente e Leopardi, Milano, Rizzoli, 1998; nuova ediz., ivi, 2006
 Il destino della tecnica, Milano, Rizzoli, 1998; nuova ediz., ivi, 2009
 La buona fede, Milano, Rizzoli, 1999
 L’anello del ritorno, Milano, Adelphi, 1999
 Crisi della tradizione occidentale, Milano, Marinotti, 1999
 La legna e la cenere. Discussioni sul significato dell'esistenza, Milano, Rizzoli, 2000
 Il mio scontro con la Chiesa, Milano, Rizzoli, 2001
 La Gloria, Milano, Adelphi, 2001
 Oltre l’uomo e oltre Dio, con Alessandro Di Chiara, Genova, Il melangolo, 2002
 Lezioni sulla politica, Milano, Marinotti, 2002
 Tecnica e architettura, Milano, Cortina, 2003
 Dall'Islam a Prometeo, Milano, Rizzoli, 2003
 Fondamento della contraddizione, Milano, Adelphi, 2005
 Nascere, e altri problemi della coscienza religiosa, Milano, Rizzoli, 2005
 La natura dell'embrione, Milano, Rizzoli, 2005
 Il muro di pietra. Sul tramonto della tradizione filosofica, Milano, Rizzoli, 2006
 L'identità della follia. Lezioni veneziane, a cura di Giorgio Brianese, Giulio Goggi, Ines Testoni, Milano, Rizzoli, 2007
 Oltrepassare, Milano, Adelphi, 2007
 Dialogo su Etica e Scienza (con Edoardo Boncinelli), 2008, Editrice San Raffaele, Milano
 Immortalità e destino, Milano, Rizzoli, 2008
 La buona fede, Milano, Rizzoli, 2008
 L'etica del capitalismo, Milano, Albo Versorio, 2008
 Verità, volontà, destino, con un saggio di M. Donà, Milano-Udine, Mimesis, 2008(con due CD audio).
 L'identità del destino, Milano, Rizzoli, 2009
 Il diverso come icona del male, Bollati Boringhieri, 2009
 Democrazia, tecnica, capitalismo, Morcelliana, 2009
 Discussioni intorno al senso della verità, Pisa, Edizioni ETS, 2009
 La guerra e il mortale, a cura di Luca Taddio, con un saggio di Giorgio Brianese, Milano-Udine, Mimesis, 2010 (con due CD audio).
 Macigni e spirito di gravità, Milano, Rizzoli, 2010
 L'intima mano, Milano, Adelphi, 2010
 Il mio ricordo degli eterni, Rizzoli, 2011
 La morte e la terra, Milano, Adelphi, 2011
 The Essence of Nihilism, London-New York, Verso Books, 2016
 Il futuro della filosofia,'' a cura di Riccardo Rita, Roma, Armando Curcio Editore, 2021

References

External links
Official website of Professor Emanuele Severino

1929 births
2020 deaths
University of Pavia alumni
20th-century Italian philosophers
21st-century Italian philosophers
Philosophers of technology
Academic staff of the Università Cattolica del Sacro Cuore
Italian scholars of ancient Greek philosophy
Italian Freemasons